John Crawley (born 1971) is a retired English cricketer.

John Crawley may also refer to:

John Crawley (soccer) (born 1972), Australian former soccer player
 John A. Crawley (1834–1881), London-based English architect
John Sayer Crawley (1867–1948), English actor
John Crawley (judge) (1940–2013), American jurist and lawyer